Margaret Cheney (born 1955) is an American mathematician whose research involves inverse problems. She is Yates Chair and Professor of Mathematics at Colorado State University.

Education and career
Cheney graduated from Oberlin College in 1976, with a double major in mathematics and physics. She completed her Ph.D. in 1982 at Indiana University Bloomington. Her dissertation, Quantum Mechanical Scattering and Inverse Scattering in Two Dimensions, was supervised by Roger G. Newton.

After postdoctoral study at Stanford University, Cheney took a faculty position at Duke University in 1984, and moved to the Rensselaer Polytechnic Institute in 1988. In 2012 she moved again to Colorado State University as Yates Chair.

Recognition
In 2000, Cheney became the inaugural Lise Meitner Visiting Professor at Lund University.

Cheney was elected as a SIAM Fellow in 2009 "for contributions to inverse problems in acoustics and electromagnetic theory". In 2012, Oberlin College gave her an honorary doctorate.

Selected publications

Book

Review article

Research articles

References

External links
Home page

1955 births
Living people
20th-century American mathematicians
21st-century American mathematicians
American women mathematicians
Oberlin College alumni
Indiana University Bloomington alumni
Duke University faculty
Rensselaer Polytechnic Institute faculty
Colorado State University faculty
Fellows of the Society for Industrial and Applied Mathematics
20th-century women mathematicians
21st-century women mathematicians
20th-century American women
21st-century American women